The 2013 Campeonato Catarinense - Divisão Principal was the 90th season of Santa Catarina's top professional football league. The competition began on 19 January and ended on 19 May. Criciúma won the championship by the 10th time.

Format
First stage
 All ten teams play a round-robin playing once against each other team.
 The best team in this stage qualifies to the Final Stage.

Second stage
 All ten teams play a round-robin playing once against each other team.
 The best team in this stage qualifies to the Final Stage.

Semifinal stage
 The two teams that won the first and the second stage are joined by the two best teams in the overall standings. 
 Home-and-away playoffs between the teams.

Finals
 Home-and-away playoffs between the winners of the first and second stages.
 The winner of the Finals is crowned champion.

Relegation
 The two worst teams in the overall standings are relegated to the second division of Campeonato Catarinense.

Teams

First phase

First stage

Results

Second stage

Results

Overall standings

Final stage

Semi-finals

Finals

Notes

References

Campeonato Catarinense seasons
Catarinense